Association Sportive Artistique et Culturelle Ndiambour (abbreviated ASEC Ndiambour, Wolof: Njaambur or Njambuur) is a Senegalese football club based in Louga, which is part of the Senegal National League 2 Poule A (second tier). Their home stadium is Stade ASEC Ndiambour, also known as Alboury Ndiaye.

Ndiambour (or Ndjambour) also is fifth in the number of major honours won in Senegal numbering seven.

History
The team was founded in 1969. It is named after the historic province of Cayor (Wolof: Kayor) once existed in the pre-colonial times, it corresponds to Louga Region today.

Championship history
Their first cup final appearance was in 1985 and lost to ASC Diaraf 1-0, their second appearance also lost by a goal to US Gorée in the 1996 edition, Ndiambour won the 1999 edition after defeating SONACOS of Diourbel only in penalty shoots of 3-0 as the game was tied a goal apiece, this was their final appearance.

They played up to 2009 in the top division in Senegalese football, they were last place in Group A with 12 points and relegated into Ligue 2, they remained until they were first place in the 2014-15 season and returned to the top division for the following season.  ASEC Ndiambour finished 10th with 32 points, nine wins and scored 20 goals, the club conceded 28 goals in 2016. Ndjambour started 6th, then 12th at the second round then 14th at the fourth round and did not return to 12th until the 12th round. At the 16th round, Ndjambour feared that they could be possibly relegated for Ligue 2, Ndjambour was 14th at the 19th round but climbed back to 20th a week later. In the last two rounds, they shared the same result (6 wins, 8 draws, 11 losses) as to Linguère's, after Ndjambour's 2-0 win over Niarry-Tally and scored the club's last goals of the season.  Ndjambour kept their chance of remaining in Ligue 1 and had 26 goals, two more than Linguères and returned to the 12th position. At the final round, the made a scoreless draw with Douanes and the club will participate in Ligue 1 in the following season, also their results changed and had 9 draws and 11 wins, but had the same 6 wins with three other clubs including Douanes, Teungueth FC and Linguère.  In goal concessions, Ndjambour suffered and conceded 42 goals, the most of the season, behind 7th place Mbour Petite-Côte with 37.

Continental appearances
They've participated in seven continental tournaments in the continental level, five of them were cup tournaments, their greatest success was the quarter-finals in the CAF Cup Winner's Cup.  Their first cup appearance was in 1992 where they first challenged with East End Lions from Sierra Leone, as the two matches were scoreless, they scored 5 in penalties to get to the next round where they later challenged with Tunisia's CA Bizertin and lost the competition.  Their recent cup competition was in 2005 where they faced King Faisal Babes from Ghana and only scored a goal in two of its legs.

Their first continental appearance was in 1993 and faced Cape Verde's CS Mindelense, the first leg was tied apiece at one, they won two goals to one in the second leg and head up to the first round with Morocco's Wydad Casablanca and won 2-1 in the first leg and lost 3-1 in the second and were removed from further competition.  Their second and recent was the 1999 competition as it would be called the CAF Champions League and faced against the Invincible Eleven from Liberia, the other club withdrew and Ndiambour headed to the first round against Raja Casablanca of up north in Morocco and won 2-1 in the first leg and lost 2-1 in the second leg and Ndiambour was out of the competition.

Staff

 Ousmane Seck (chairman as of 2010)
 Assane Diallo (manager as of 2010)

Honours
Senegal Premier League: 3
 1992, 1994, 1998

Senegal FA Cup: 1
 1999

Senegal Assemblée Nationale Cup: 4
 1998, 2002, 2004

Senegal Second League (Ligue 2): 1
 2015

League and cup history

Performance in CAF competitions

WAFU Club Championship

National level

Statistics
Best appearance: First round (continental), second round (cup, continental)
Best position at a cup competition: Quarterfinals (continental)
Appearances at a Super Cup competition: 3
Highest number of points in a season: 65
Total goals scored at a national cup final: 1
Total matches played at the CAF Champions League: 7
Total matches played at home: 4
Total matches played away: 3
Total number of wins at the CAF Champions League: 4
Total home wins: 4
Total draw at the CAF Champions League: 1
Total away draw:1
Total number of goals scored at the CAF Champions League: 13
Total matches played at the continental cup competitions: 20
Total matches played at home: 10
Total matches played away: 10
Total number of wins at the continental cup competitions: 6
Total number of draws at the continental cup competitions: 7Total draws at home: 4Total draws away: 3Total number of goals scored at the continental cup competitions:'15

Other sports
Ndiambour also has its own basketball team known as Ndiambour Louga.

See also
Ndiambour, a historic province
Diambour Democratic Bloc (Bloc démocratique du Diambour)Njambuur (P773)'', ship of the Senegalese Navy

Notes

External links
 Continental Tournaments
 Achievements of ASEC Ndiambour

 
Football clubs in Senegal
1969 establishments in Senegal
Association football clubs established in 1969